Seven ships of the Royal Navy have borne the name HMS Niger after the Niger River, whilst another was planned.

  was a 33-gun fifth rate launched in 1759, reduced to sixth rate, converted to a prison ship in 1810, and renamed Negro in 1813. She was sold in 1814.
  was a 38-gun fifth rate, launched in 1813 and broken up in 1820.
  was a wood screw sloop launched in 1846 and sold in 1869.
  was a composite paddle vessel launched in 1880, renamed Cockatrice in 1881, Moorhen in 1896, and sold in 1899.
  was a torpedo gunboat launched in 1892, converted to a minesweeper in 1909, and sunk in 1914 by the German submarine  near Deal.
  was a  launched in 1936 and sunk by a mine near Iceland in 1942.
She was laid down in 1944, but was cancelled two months later.
  was an Algerine-class minesweeper, launched in 1945, and scrapped in 1966.

References
 
 
 

Royal Navy ship names